The 1979 Italian general election was held in Italy on 3 June 1979. This election was called just a week before the European vote: the failure to hold the two elections at the same time caused much criticism for wasting public money.

Terrorist attacks by the Red Brigades caused a reversal in the result of the previous election three years before: for the first time the Italian Communist Party lost significant numbers of seats, delaying the government change that had seemed imminent in 1976. The Communist defeat gave a new strength to all the minor parties, as concentrating the vote on the Christian Democracy Party seemed less necessary to prevent a communist victory. The Christian Democrats remained stable nonetheless, while the neo-fascist Italian Social Movement was weakened by the success of its spin-off National Democracy.

Electoral system
The pure party-list proportional representation had traditionally become the electoral system for the Chamber of Deputies. Italian provinces were united in 32 constituencies, each electing a group of candidates. At constituency level, seats were divided between open lists using the largest remainder method with Imperiali quota. Remaining votes and seats were transferred at national level, where they were divided using the Hare quota, and automatically distributed to best losers into the local lists.

For the Senate, 237 single-seat constituencies were established, even if the assembly had risen to 315 members. The candidates needed a landslide victory of two thirds of votes to be elected, a goal which could be reached only by the German minorities in South Tirol. All remained votes and seats were grouped in party lists and regional constituencies, where a D'Hondt method was used: inside the lists, candidates with the best percentages were elected.

Historical background

On 16 July 1976, Bettino Craxi was elected to the vacant Italian Socialist Party chairman position, ending years of factional fighting within the party. Ironically, the "old guard" saw him as short-lived leader, allowing each faction time to regroup. However, he was able to hold on to power and implement his policies. In particular, he sought and managed to distance his party away from the communists bringing it into an alliance with Christian Democracy and other centrist parties, but maintaining a leftist and reformist profile.

On 16 March 1978, former Prime Minister and Christian Democratic leader Aldo Moro was kidnapped by the Red Brigades, and five of his bodyguards killed. The Red Brigades were a militant leftist group, then led by Mario Moretti. Aldo Moro was a left-leaning Christian Democrat who served several times as Prime Minister. Before his murder he was trying to include the Italian Communist Party (PCI), headed by Enrico Berlinguer, in the government through a deal called the Historic Compromise. The PCI was the largest communist party in western Europe. This was largely because of its non-extremist and pragmatic stance, its growing independence from Moscow and its eurocommunist doctrine. The PCI was especially strong in areas such as Emilia Romagna, where it had stable government positions and mature practical experience, which may have contributed to a more pragmatic approach to politics. The Red Brigades were fiercely opposed by the Communist Party and trade unions, a few left-wing politicians even used the condescending expression "comrades who do wrong" (Compagni che sbagliano). The circumstances surrounding Aldo Moro's murder have never been made clear, but the consequences included the fact that PCI did not gain executive power.

Investigative journalist Carmine Pecorelli was assassinated on March 20, 1979. In a May 1978 article, he had drawn connections between Aldo Moro's kidnapping and Gladio.

In the period of terror attacks of the late 1970s and early 1980s, the parliamentary majority was composed by the parties of the "Arco costituzionale", i.e. all parties supporting the Constitution, including the Communists (who in fact took a very strong stance against the Red Brigades and other terrorist groups). However, the Communists never took part in the Government itself, which was composed by the "Pentapartito" (Christian Democrats, Socialists, Social Democrats, Liberals, Republicans).

Parties and leaders

Results
Even this eighth legislature of the Italian Republic was a period of great instability. After the election, the Christian-Democratic leadership instructed moderate Francesco Cossiga to form a centrist minority government with the PSDI and the PLI, which accepted an official engagement into the government for the first time since 1973; however, when in 1980 Benigno Zaccagnini was fired as Secretary of the DC and socialist leader Bettino Craxi offered his help, Cossiga suddenly resigned and formed a new centre-left government with the PSI and the PRI, underling that the Catholic leaders had no more problems to choose their allies from anywhere. However, Cossiga later fell on a budget project, and a traditional centre-left government led by Arnaldo Forlani was formed. The great scandal of the masonic lodge P2 sank Forlani in 1981.

This deep political crisis marked the birth of a new political formula which ruled Italy during the 80's: the Pentapartito (or five parties), which was no more than the fusion of the two main alliances that DC had used to rule Italy since 1947, the centrism and the centre-left. This formula became possible because Bettino Craxi's Italian Socialist Party and Valerio Zanone's Italian Liberal Party accepted to form their first republican government together, moderating their positions and passing the opposition that had always divided them. But the Pentapartito pact had another important condition: the DC accepted to recognize a pair role with the other four parties, alternating into the government leadership. The Secretary of the Italian Republican Party, Giovanni Spadolini, so became the first non-DC Prime Minister of Italy since 1945. However, his little party was unable to stop the quarrels between their great allies, and after a little crisis during summer 1982, Spadolini resigned in autumn of the same year. Former-PM Amintore Fanfani formed a new government without the offended republicans, but the PSI, which had good surveys, imposed the final crisis in 1983 and a new general election.

Chamber of Deputies

Results by constituency

Senate of the Republic

Results by constituency

Maps

References

External links

1979
General election
June 1979 events in Europe